Cercosaura schreibersii, known commonly as Schreibers's many-fingered teiid  or the long-tailed little lizard, is a species of lizard in the family Gymnophthalmidae. The species is endemic to South America.

Etymology
The specific name, schreibersii, is in honor of Austrian naturalist Carl Franz Anton Ritter von Schreibers.

Geographic range
C. schreibersii is found in Argentina, Bolivia, Brazil, Paraguay, and Uruguay.

Habitat
The preferred natural habitats of C. schreibersii are forest, savanna, shrubland, and grassland.

Subspecies
Two subspecies are recognized as being valid, including the nominotypical subspecies.
Cercosaura schreibersii albostrigatus 
Cercosaura schreibersii schreibersii 

Nota bene: A trinomial authority in parentheses indicates that the subspecies was originally described in a genus other than Cercosaura.

Reproduction
C. schreibersii is oviparous.

References

Further reading
Boulenger GA (1885). Catalogue of the Lizards in the British Museum (Natural History). Second Edition. Volume II. ... Teiidæ ... . London: Trustees of the British Museum (Natural History). (Taylor and Francis, printers). xiii + 497 pp. + Plates I-XXIV. (Pantodactylus schreibersii, pp. 388–389).
Wiegmann AFA (1834). Herpetologia Mexicana, seu Descriptio Amphibiorum Novae Hispaniae, quae Itineribus Comitis de Sack, Ferdinandi Deppe et Chri. Guil. Schiede in Museum Berolinense Pervenerunt. Pars Prima, Saurorum Species Amplectens. Adiecto Systematis Saurorom Prodromo, Additisque Multis in hunc Amphibiorum Ordinem Observervationibus. Berlin: C.G. Lüderitz. vi + 54 pp + Plates I-X. (Cercosaura schreibersii, new species, p. 10). (in Latin).

Cercosaura
Reptiles described in 1834
Taxa named by Arend Friedrich August Wiegmann